The Niels Aagesen House (Danish: Niels Aagesens Gård) is a property at Amaliegade 22 in the Frederiksstaden district of central Copenhagen, Denmark.

History

18th century
The house was built for Niels Aagesen in 1750-1751. The building was like many of the other early Grederiksstaden buildings constructed to designs by Niels Eigtved who had also created the masterplan for the new neighborhood. Aagesen's property was listed in the new cadastre of 1756 as part of the vast No. 71 in St, Ann's East Quarter. It was later referred to as No.  71 F 2. The property was marked on Christian Gedde's 1757 cadastral map of St. Ann's East Quarter as No. 336-

The writer and historian Tyge Rothe (1731-1795) resided in the building in 1772. Joachim Otto Schack-Rathlou (1728-1800) were among the residents from 1773 to 1782.

19th century
 

The property was listed in the new cadastre of 1806 as No. 126 in St. Ann's East Quarter. It belonged to one Countess Haxthausen at that time. 

Admiral Steen Andersen Bille (1751-1833) lived in the building in 1816 and again in 1823-1829.

The building was later expanded for master builder Christian Olsen Aagaard in 1845-1846 . Tivoli Gardens-founder Georg Carstensen lived in the building in 1847. The poet Adam Oehlenschläger has also been a resident. The diplomat and minister H. E. Reedtz (1800-1857)  lived there in the early 1850s and the politician C. A. Bluhme (1794-1866)  lived there in 1855. General Christian de Meza (1792-1865) lived in the building in 1858 and again in 1864-1865. Aleth Hansen, who had recently served as Minister of Education, lived briefly in the building in 1870.

20th and 21st centuries
In 1919, Poul Carl was among the residents. Princess Thyra, owned the building from 1930 and lived there until her death in 1945.

Amaliegade 22 was in the 2000s owned by Poul Kjærgaard Balle-Petersen. In 2008, he sold it for DKK 86 million to Christian Levin. In 2017, Levin sold it to Claus Molbech Bendtsen for DKK 135 million.

Today
A number of companies are now based in the building, including the law firms Kønig & Partnere Advokatfirma and Sonha Toft.

References

External links
 Bendtsen

Listed residential buildings in Copenhagen